The 1957 Harvard Crimson football team was an American football team that represented Harvard University as a member of the Ivy League during the 1957 NCAA University Division football season. 

In their first year under head coach John Yovicsin, the Crimson compiled a 3–5 record and were outscored 180 to 78. Thomas B. Hooper was the team captain.

Harvard's 2–5 conference record finished seventh in the Ivy League. The Crimson were outscored 173 to 64 by Ivy opponents. 

Harvard played its home games at Harvard Stadium in the Allston neighborhood of Boston, Massachusetts.

Schedule

References

Harvard
Harvard Crimson football seasons
Harvard Crimson football
1950s in Boston